The 2008 Pacific Nations Cup was a rugby union tournament held between six national sides on the Pacific Rim: Australia A, Fiji, Japan, Samoa, Tonga and New Zealand Māori (just for this year). The inaugural competition was held in 2006. This year the tournament started on 7 June and ended on 6 July 2008.

The tournament is a round-robin where each team plays all of the other teams once. There are four points for a win, two for a draw and none for a defeat. There are also bonus points offered with one bonus point for scoring four or more tries in a match and one bonus point for losing by 7 points or less.

Table

Schedule

Round 1

Round 2

Round 3

Round 4

Round 5

Top scorers

Top points scorers

Source: irb.com

Top try scorers

Source: irb.com

See also

2008 IRB Nations Cup

References

External links
 IRB Pacific Nations Cup - from the IRB website (June 17, 2008)
 Schedule - IRB website (pdf)
IRB Pacific Nations schedule announced - IRB website, 4 March 2008

2008
2008 rugby union tournaments for national teams
2008 in Australian rugby union
2008 in Fijian rugby union
2008 in Samoan rugby union
2008 in Tongan rugby union
2008 in New Zealand rugby union
2007–08 in Japanese rugby union
2008 in Oceanian rugby union